Robert Turner Jr. (born May 6, 1949) is an American football coach who was most recently a Senior offensive assistant for the San Francisco 49ers. Since 1995, he has worked exclusively on the staffs of Mike Shanahan during his time with the Denver Broncos and Washington Redskins and then his son Kyle with the Atlanta Falcons and San Francisco 49ers.

Coaching career

Early coaching career
Early in his coaching days, Turner worked as an assistant football and basketball coach at Kokomo, Indiana's Haworth High School from 1972–74.

College coaching
He moved to the college ranks in 1975, working for the Indiana State University football program in various roles until 1982.

In 1983, he went to Fresno State University, where he was the team's running backs coach through 1988. One of the players he coached was future coach Kelly Skipper.

In his final collegiate coaching stop before moving to the NFL, Turner served as assistant head coach, offensive coordinator and running backs coach at Purdue University from 1991 to 1994. While at Purdue, he would coach RB Mike Alstott.

Turner was the running backs coach at Ohio State University from 1989 to 1990; in this period, the Buckeyes reached bowl games in both seasons and had the top rushing game in the Big Ten Conference in 1989. In 1990, he would coach running backs Robert Smith, Butler By'not'e, and Raymont Harris.

Broncos
From 1995–2009 Turner worked as the running backs coach for the Denver Broncos. This was after over 20 years as a college assistant.

Redskins
In 2010, he was hired to be the running backs coach by his former colleague, Mike Shanahan, after Mike was selected to be the new head coach of the Washington Redskins.

Falcons
On February 3, 2015, Dan Quinn announced that Turner would be his Running Backs coach.

In the 2016 season, Turner and the Falcons reached Super Bowl LI, where they faced the New England Patriots on February 5, 2017. In the Super Bowl, the Falcons fell in a 34–28 overtime defeat.

49ers
In 2017 Turner became the running backs coach for the 49ers.

On March 1, 2022, it was reported that Turner was not returning to the San Francisco 49ers for the  season to rehab from two surgeries. On September 30, 2022, it was announced that Turner would return for the 2022 season.

Personal life
Turner grew up in East Chicago, Indiana, and attended EC's Washington High School, where he was a multi-sport athlete. He played basketball for Johnnie Baratto. He graduated from Indiana State University.

References

1949 births
Living people
Atlanta Falcons coaches
Denver Broncos coaches
Fresno State Bulldogs football coaches
Indiana State Sycamores football coaches
Indiana State Sycamores football players
Ohio State Buckeyes football coaches
Purdue Boilermakers football coaches
San Francisco 49ers coaches
Washington Redskins coaches
High school football coaches in Indiana
Sportspeople from East Chicago, Indiana
People from Midway, Alabama
Sportspeople from Kokomo, Indiana